AnnaLynne McCord (born July 16, 1987) is an American actress, activist, and model. 

Known for playing vixen-type roles, McCord first gained prominence in 2007 as the scheming Eden Lord on the FX television series Nip/Tuck, and as the pampered Loren Wakefield on the MyNetworkTV telenovela American Heiress. In 2008, she was cast in The CW series 90210, portraying antiheroine Naomi Clark. Initially, the part of Clark was conceived as a supporting role. By the end of the first season, however, media outlets had begun referring to McCord as the series' lead.

Early life 
McCord was born July 16, 1987 in Atlanta, the daughter of David McCord, a Christian pastor. She was raised in Buford, and Monroe in Georgia, where she grew up of modest means, living in a trailer park. Her parents believed in "strict discipline", in which she was not allowed to watch Harry Potter because it had witches in it. She has two sisters, Rachel and Angel. McCord was home-schooled by her mother Shari McCord, and graduated from high school at the age of 15.

Career
After graduating, McCord joined the Wilhelmina Modeling Agency in Miami. 

McCord attended a drama school in New York City by the age of 17. A year later, she moved to Los Angeles to audition for roles. She appeared in the 2005 Italian film Natale a Miami and the 2007 horror film remake Day of the Dead. In addition to appearances on Close to Home and The O.C., she played rebellious Loren Wakefield on the MyNetworkTV limited-run serial American Heiress. She was also cast as the star in another MyNetworkTV telenovela, Rules of Deception, but the show never aired, due to a change in the network's programming strategy away from telenovelas. 

McCord portrayed Eden Lord in the fifth season of the FX series Nip/Tuck. McCord said in an interview with fearnet.com that it was "fun to play a bad girl."

In 2008, McCord was cast in the series 90210 as Naomi Clark. Throughout the show, McCord's character vies for social power and love.

She accepted a role in the Off Broadway play Love, Loss, and What I Wore for an April 27 through May 29, 2011, run with Conchata Ferrell, Minka Kelly, Anne Meara, and B. Smith.

McCord's role in the 2012 film Excision was critically praised. In 2014, McCord joined the cast of the TNT series Dallas for its third season, in the recurring role of Heather. She played the lead role in the 2015 Lifetime film Watch Your Back. In 2018, she starred in First We Take Brooklyn along with Danny A. Abeckaser.

Personal life

McCord is a supporter of the St. Bernard Project, a rebuilding organization dedicated to assisting victims of Hurricane Katrina.

In 2011, McCord began dating actor Dominic Purcell. The couple announced an amicable split in 2014, but rekindled their romance a year later. McCord was with Purcell when he suffered a near-fatal accident on the set of Prison Break in Morocco on June 1, 2016, after an iron bar used as a set piece fell onto his head. The couple split in 2018 and stated they were on good terms. On September 25, 2020, Purcell confirmed they had rekindled their relationship with an Instagram post.

In 2014, McCord revealed that she was sexually assaulted when she was 18 by a male friend, and as a result broke down during her rape scene in 90210.
In March 2015, while speaking at the United Nations in support of UN Women for Peace Association (UNWFPA), McCord announced her alignment with the anti-sexual-assault and domestic abuse project, the No More Campaign. McCord has stated that she has been practicing meditation to help cope with her trauma, and has created a global meditation tour known as the "Love Storm Tour" to help raise awareness of human trafficking. In 2018, McCord was in treatment for PTSD and memories of child sexual abuse, back to the age of 11. In April 2021, she revealed that she had been diagnosed with dissociative identity disorder.

In February 2022, following the 2022 Russian invasion of Ukraine, McCord released a video of herself reading a poem on her Twitter postulating that if she had loved Vladimir Putin as a mother, perhaps an invasion of Ukraine could have been avoided. The video was met with derision by observers and critics, who likened it to Gal Gadot's cover of "Imagine", which was similarly criticized for its perceived tone-deaf message. In an interview with Buzzfeed News, McCord defended the video, claiming that she could have easily become a dictator under different circumstances.

Filmography

References

External links

 

1987 births
21st-century American actresses
Actresses from Atlanta
American film actresses
American people of Scottish descent
American telenovela actresses
American television actresses
Female models from Georgia (U.S. state)
Georgia (U.S. state) Democrats
Living people
People with dissociative identity disorder